Amma Makal is an Indian Malayalam-language soap opera. The show was premiered on 25 October 2021 on Zee Keralam and streams on-demand through ZEE5. It stars Mithra Kurian, Mariya Prince, Rajeev Roshan and Sreejith Vijay. The show is the television debut of the film actress Mithra Kurian.

Synopsis
Anu and her mother share the purest mother-daughter bond, but when Anu realises that her mother's priorities are changing, her extremist behaviour creates ruffles in the  relationship.

Cast

Main
 Mithra Kurian as Sangeetha
 Mariya Prince as Anu Nanda
 Rajeev Roshan as Nandan
 Sreejith Vijay as Dr. Vipin Vallabhan

Recurring
 Sindhu Varma as Lekshmi
 Jishin Mohan as Praveen
 Yamuna
 Mohan Ayroor
 Indira Thampi as Parameshwaran 
 Thushara as Achu
 Balachandran Chullikkadu as Govindan Maash
 Sadhika Venugopal as Dr. Hemalatha
 Manka Mahesh as Maheshwari
 Chilanka S Dheedu as Nilima
 Swapna Tresa as Vaiga
 Pramod Mani as Prathapan
 Sreelekshmi Haridas as Divyapraba
 Ranjith Raj
 Vimal Raj
 Divyachandralekha as Shakti Parvathi

Production

Filming
A boat mishap sequence was shot in Ashtamudi Lake. Such a sequence was filmed for the first time in Malayalam television. The show's director, A.M. Naseer, said, "We had the chance to shoot in the shallow areas of the lake but it lacked quality. So, we decided to shoot it in the middle of Ashtamudi. We almost shot the entire day with perfection."

Casting
The film actress Mithra Kurian plays the protagonist, Sangeetha, in her television debut. Sangeetha's college-going daughter, Anu, is played by debutant Mariya Prince while her husband, Nandan is played by Rajeev Roshan. Sreejith Vijay plays the male lead as Dr. Vipin Vallabhan. Yamuna, Jishin Mohan, Sindhu Varma, Manka Mahesh, Balachandran Chullikkadu, Mohan Ayroor and Indira Thampi were cast in pivotal roles. Sadhika Venugopal made an extended cameo as Dr. Hemalatha.

The show is written by K.V. Anil and directed by Faisal Adimali. It is produced by Modi Mathew and Jayachandran under the name of Classic Frames. Adimali was later replaced by A.M. Naseer.

Broadcast
The first promotional video of Amma Makal featuring the lead actresses Kurian and Prince was released in October 2021. The show was premiered on Zee Keralam on 25 October 2021 and shown every day at the 9:00 p.m. IST. On the digital platform, it is available for viewing on ZEE5.

On 5 June 2022, a one-hour episode of the show was broadcast on Zee Keralam at 7.00 pm IST.

Soundtrack

Reception
Reviewing the first episode of the show, a reviewer for The Times of India was impressed with the "refreshing star cast and novel storyline" and thought that "the show has managed to evoke an element of suspense among the viewers within the first episode". However, the cliched and non-progressive scenes were criticised.

In a poll conducted on the official Instagram account of ETimes TV to pick the best entertainer between Daya: Chentheeyil Chalicha Kumkumapottu and Amma Makal, 78% of the respondents voted in favour of Daya.

References

External links
 Official website 
 

Indian drama television series
Indian television soap operas
Indian television series
Malayalam-language television shows
2021 Indian television series debuts
Zee Keralam original programming